Julien Benneteau was the defending champion but chose not to defend his title.

Elias Ymer won the title after defeating Yannick Maden 7–5, 6–4 in the final.

Seeds

Draw

Finals

Top half

Bottom half

References
Main Draw
Qualifying Draw

Internationaux de Tennis de Vendée - Singles
2017 Singles